Cycloschizon is a genus of fungi in the family Parmulariaceae.

Species
Cycloschizon alyxiae
Cycloschizon araucariae
Cycloschizon brachylaenae
Cycloschizon capense
Cycloschizon ciferrianum
Cycloschizon discoideum
Cycloschizon elaeicolum
Cycloschizon fimbriatum
Cycloschizon macarangae
Cycloschizon oleae-dioicae
Cycloschizon pollaccii
Cycloschizon porrigo
Cycloschizon pritzelii
Cycloschizon styracis

References

External links
Cycloschizon at Index Fungorum

Parmulariaceae